Dendropsophus joannae is a species of frogs in the family Hylidae. It is known from the Pando Department, northern Bolivia (where its type locality is), western Brazil (Acre and Amazonas states), and Madre de Dios Region of southeastern Peru. It is similar to Dendropsophus leali but is smaller, has a shorter snout, more protuberant eyes,  and more tuberculate dorsal skin. The specific name joannae honors Mrs. Jo Ann Oxley Foster, a BIOPAT patron supporting taxonomic research and nature conservation.

Description
Adult males measure  and adult females, based on two specimens only,  in snout–vent length. The body is slender. The snout is rounded. The tympanum is distinct with prominent annulus; the supratympanic fold is evident. The fingers and the toes are short and bear large discs; the fingers are about two-fifths webbed while the toes are about four-fifths webbed. The dorsum is grayish or yellowish tan with brown markings. The finger and toe discs
are dorsally bright yellow. The ventral surfaces of limbs and belly are fleshy transparent. The chest is cream and the throat is yellowish. The inner iris is red, surrounded by narrow tan ring.

Habitat and conservation
Breeding presumably takes place in ponds and ditches. It appears to be an adaptable species and is considered not to likely to be facing major threats. It occurs in a number of protected areas in Brazil.

References

joannae
Frogs of South America
Amphibians of Bolivia
Amphibians of Brazil
Amphibians of Peru
Amphibians described in 2001
Taxonomy articles created by Polbot
Taxa named by Jörn Köhler